Sydney James Tuffnell (11 October 1904 – 1990) was an English professional association football player. Born in Sheffield, he joined Blackpool from Worksop Town in 1927, making 90 Football League appearances for the club.

He was signed by Wigan Athletic in August 1934. He spent three seasons at the club, scoring nine goals in 108 Cheshire League appearances. In June 1937, he joined Buxton.

References

1904 births
1990 deaths
English footballers
Footballers from Sheffield
Worksop Town F.C. players
Blackpool F.C. players
Wigan Athletic F.C. players
Buxton F.C. players
Association football wing halves